Miduthuru is a village located in  Nandyal district of Andhra Pradesh, India.

Geography

Midthur MRO Number and Midthur MRO LIST from 2010 to 2016.

References

Villages in Nandyal district